Shelly Beach can refer to:
Australia
 Shelly Beach, Central Coast New South Wales, on the Central Coast of New South Wales, Australia
 Shelly Beach (Manly), in Sydney, New South Wales, Australia
 Shelly Beach (Cronulla), in Sydney, New South Wales, Australia
 Shelly Beach, Queensland (Sunshine Coast), on the Sunshine Coast of Queensland, Australia
 Shelly Beach, Queensland (Townsville), a suburb in the City of Townsville, Queensland, Australia
 New Zealand
 Shelly Beach, New Zealand, a settlement in the Auckland Region
 South Africa
 Shelly Beach, KwaZulu-Natal, a town on the KwaZulu-Natal South Coast, South Africa